Mahmud Tarzi (Dari: محمود بیگ طرزی; August 23, 1865 – November 22, 1933) was an Afghan politician and intellectual. He is known as the father of Afghan journalism. He became a key figure in the history of Afghanistan, following the lead of Mustafa Kemal Atatürk in Turkey by working for modernization and secularization, and strongly opposing religious extremism and obscurantism. Tarzi emulated the Young Turks coalition.

Early years

Tarzi was born August 23, 1865, in Ghazni, Afghanistan. An ethnic Pashtun, his father was Ghulam Muhammad Tarzi, leader of the Mohammadzai royal house of Kandahar and a poet. His mother, Sultanat Begum belonged to Popalzai tribe, and was the fourth wife of his father. In 1881, shortly after Emir Abdur Rahman Khan came to power, Mahmud's father and the rest of the Tarzi family were expelled from Afghanistan. They first travelled to Karachi, Sindh, where they lived from January 1882 to March 1885. They then moved to the Ottoman Empire.

Tarzi began to explore the Middle East. He made a pilgrimage to Mecca, visited Paris, and toured the eastern Mediterranean. He also encountered Jamal ad-Din al-Afghani in Constantinople. On a second trip to Damascus, Syria, in 1891, Tarzi married the daughter of Saleh Al-Mossadiah, a muezzin of the Umayyad mosque. She became his second wife (the first, an Afghan, having died in Damascus). Tarzi stayed in Turkey until the age of 35, where he became fluent in a number of languages, including his native tongue Pashto as well as Dari, Turkish, French, Arabic, and Urdu.

A year after Abdur Rahman Khan's death in 1901, Habibullah Khan invited the Tarzi family back to Afghanistan. Tarzi received a post in the government. There he began to introduce Western ideas in Afghanistan. Tarzi's daughter, Soraya Tarzi, married King Amanullah Khan and become Queen of Afghanistan.

Journalism and poetry
One of Tarzi's earliest works was the Account of a Journey (Sayahat-Namah-e Manzum), which was published in Lahore, British India (now Pakistan). However, Tarzi's most influential work – and the foundation of journalism in Afghanistan – was his publishing of Seraj-al-Akhbar. This newspaper was published bi-weekly from October 1911 to January 1919. It played an important role in the development of an Afghan modernist movement, serving as a forum for a small, enlightened group of young Afghans, who provided the ethical justification and basic tenets of Afghan nationalism and modernism under of the very first political party, Party of the Afghan Youth, ideologically secularist, monarchist and state nationalist with a right-of centre political direction, in opposition to the later Constitutional Party, a second political party whose ideologically liberal democratic, reformist, progressive with a constitutional monarchist and left-wing nationalist direction maintaining a strong anticlerical secularist state and within centrist politics. Tarzi also published Seraj-al-Atfal (Children's Lamp), the first Afghan publication aimed at a juvenile audience.

Tarzi was the first who introduced the novel in Afghanistan and translated many English and French novels to Persian. He also contributed in editing, translations, and modernization of the Afghan press. He translated into Persian many major works of European authors, such as Around the World in Eighty Days, Twenty Thousand Leagues Under the Sea, The Mysterious Island, International Law (from Turkish), and the History of the Russo-Japanese War. When he lived in Turkey and Syria, he immersed himself in reading and research, using Western literary and scientific sources. In Damascus, Tarzi wrote The Garden of Learning, containing choice articles about literary, artistic, travel and scientific matters. Another book entitled The Garden of Knowledge (later published in Kabul), concludes with an article "My beloved country, Afghanistan", in which he tells his Afghan countrymen how much he longs for his native land and recalls with nostalgia the virtues of its climate, mountains and deserts. In 1914, his novel Travel Across Three Continents in Twenty-Nine Days published. In the preface, he makes an apt comment about travel and history:

Although age has its normal limits, it may be extended by two things-the study of history and by travel. Reading history broadens one's perception of the creation of the world, while travel extends one's field of vision.

Politics

Like most other Afghan leaders, Tarzi was an Afghan nationalist who held many government positions in his life. He was a reform-minded individual amongst his extended family members whom ruled Afghanistan at the beginning of the 20th century and not unlike his father Sardar Ghulam Muhammad Khan Tarzi. After King Amanullah ascended the throne, Tarzi became Afghan Foreign Minister in 1919. Shortly thereafter, the Third Anglo-Afghan War began. After the national independence from the British in 1919, Tarzi established Afghan Embassies in London, Paris, and other capitals of the world. Tarzi would also go on to play a large role in the declaration of Afghanistan's independence. From 1922 to 1924, he served as Ambassador in Paris, France. He was then again placed as Foreign Minister from 1924 to 1927. Throughout his tenure in Afghanistan, Tarzi was a high government official during the reigns of King Habibullah and his son King Amanullah Khan.

Afghanistan's 1919 Independence

Tarzi effectively guided the second movement of the young constitutionalists called Mashroota Khwah. This led to reviving the first suppressed movement of the constitutionalists in Afghanistan.

Afghan Peace Conferences
During the Third Anglo-Afghan War in 1919, when Tarzi served as Foreign Minister, British India bombarded Kabul and Jalalabad. Over a ton of munitions hit Jalalabad in a single day. Tarzi was appointed head of the Afghan Delegation at the peace conferences at Mussoorie in 1920 and Kabul in 1921. The British, who had dealt with Tarzi before, attempted to reduce his position. After four months the talks collapsed because of the Durand Line. Sir Henry Dobbs led the British delegation to Kabul in January, 1921 – Mahmud Tarzi headed the Afghan group. After 11 months of discussions, the British and Afghans signed a peace treaty normalizing their relations. Although Afghanistan was the winner of the conference – as the British accepted Afghanistan's independence – Tarzi's diplomacy was shown as the British sent a message afterwards to Tarzi, giving their good will toward all tribes.

Death
Tarzi died on November 22, 1933, at the age of 68 in Istanbul, Turkey.

See also

 Soraya Tarzi
 Reforms of Amānullāh Khān and civil war

References

External links

Official website
The Mahmud Tarzi Cultural Foundation (MTCF)
Old Photo Book – by Mahmud Tarzi
The Foundation

20th-century Afghan poets
Afghan journalists
20th-century Afghan historians
Afghan secularists
Pashtun people
1933 deaths
Foreign ministers of Afghanistan
1865 births
Ambassadors of Afghanistan to France
19th-century Afghan poets